Garri is a masculine given name. Notable people with the name include:

 Garri Aiba (died 2004), Abkhazian politician
 Garri Bardin (born 1941), Russian director, screenwriter, producer, and actor

Masculine given names